The 2010–11 ISU Short Track Speed Skating World Cup was a multi-race tournament over a season for short track speed skating. The season began on 22 October 2010 and ended on 19 February 2011. The World Cup was organised by the ISU who also ran world cups and championships in speed skating and figure skating.

Calendar

Men

Montreal

Quebec City

Changchun

Shanghai

Moscow

Dresden

Women

Montreal

Quebec City

Changchun

Shanghai

Moscow

Dresden

Final standings

Men

Women

External links 
 ISU.org World Cup Schedule

ISU Short Track Speed Skating World Cup
Isu Short Track Speed Skating World Cup, 2010-11
Isu Short Track Speed Skating World Cup, 2010-11